Włodzimierz Potasiński (31 July 1956 – 10 April 2010) was a Polish military figure, commander-in-chief of the Polish Special Forces.

Potasiński was born at Czeladź. He was killed in the 2010 Polish Air Force Tu-154 crash at Smolensk.

Honours and awards
Potasiński was awarded numerous civil and military awards, including the Order of Polonia Restituta in 2006.
 Commander's Cross of the Order of Polonia Restituta (2010, posthumously) previously awarded the Knight's Cross (2006)
 Gold Cross of Merit (2000)
 Silver Cross of Merit (1993)
 Gold Medal in the Service of the Armed Forces of the Homeland
 Gold Medal for his contribution to national defence
 Commemorative medal of the Multinational Division Central-South Iraq
 Meritorious Service Medal (2006, United States)
 United States Special Operations Command Medal (2010, United States, posthumously)
 Grand Officer of the Order of Merit (2008, Portugal)
 UN Medal UNDOF mission
 entry in the "Book of Honour of the Minister of National Defence" (2007)

References

External links
 Interview from 2009

1956 births
2010 deaths
Polish generals
People from Czeladź
Victims of the Smolensk air disaster
Commanders of the Order of Polonia Restituta
Recipients of the Gold Cross of Merit (Poland)
Grand Officers of the Order of Merit (Portugal)
Special forces of Poland